Bad Babe's Dreamer is the 13th single released by Nana Kitade. The single was released September 19, 2016 during Kitade's Bad Grrrls' Night Out # 1 event. The single was later made available for purchase on her official site. The single was released in a standard edition, as well as a limited edition package containing the single, lyrics card, five postcards, two badges, a guitar pick, a sticker, and a special aluminum packaging.

Track listing

References

External links
 Official Website

2016 singles
2016 songs
Nana Kitade songs
Songs written by Nana Kitade